Allium siskiyouense is a North American species of wild onion known by the common name Siskiyou onion. It is native to the Klamath Mountains and nearby ranges of northern California and Oregon. It grows in serpentine and other rocky soil types.

References

External links

Turner Photographics, Wildflowers of the Pacific Northwest, Allium siskiyouense, Siskiyou onion 

siskiyouense
Flora of California
Flora of Oregon
Onions
Flora without expected TNC conservation status